Silsbee High School is a public high school in Silsbee, Hardin County, Texas. It is the only high school in the Silsbee Independent School District. Their mascot is the Tiger.

Controversy 

The school and the school district have been criticized for expelling a cheerleader from the school's cheerleading squad because of her refusal to cheer for a basketball player who pleaded guilty to sexually assaulting her. The charges were dropped down to assault a year later and the player was given probation.  School officials also encouraged the victim to "keep a low profile" and avoid the school cafeteria.

The Fifth Circuit Court of Appeals ruled in November 2010 that the victim — who is identified only as H.S. — had no right to refuse to applaud her attacker, because as a cheerleader in uniform, she was an agent of the school. The Fifth Circuit dismissed her case as "frivolous" and sanctioned the girl, ordering her family to pay the school district's $35,000–45,000 legal fees. A later judgment ruled that one of the claims was not frivolous and ordered the amount owed recalculated based on this finding. The Supreme Court declined to review the case.

Notable alumni and faculty 
Curtis Buckley - played cornerback for four seasons for the Tampa Bay Buccaneers, three seasons for the San Francisco 49ers, and one season for the New York Giants and the Washington Redskins 
William Graham (American football) - played safety for six seasons for the Detroit Lions
H. Palmer Hall - poet, author, editor and librarian who taught two years at Silsbee
Mark Henry - Olympic weightlifter and professional wrestler
James Hunter (American football) - played seven seasons as a defensive back for the Detroit Lions
Brandi McCain - basketball player, played one season with the WNBA Los Angeles Sparks 
William Morrisey Jr.-Football Player (American Football) Defensive Tackle Texas A&M Aggies USA TODAY ALL-AMERICAN U.S. ARMY ALL-AMERICAN WILLIE RAY SMITH AWARD
Chloe Jones, adult actress, model. Mother of Three, and mistress of Charlie Sheen. Died 2005, At home in Houston Tx.

References

External links 
 

Schools in Hardin County, Texas
Public high schools in Texas
2000 establishments in Texas
Educational institutions established in 2000